Michelle Goos (born 27 December 1989) is a Dutch handball player for Buxtehuder SV and the Dutch national team.

Career
Goos has never been part of any youth selections or a talent identification program.

2015-16
The 2015–16 season was an important season For her. In October 2015 she won with the national team the silver medal at the 2015 World Championships. After being unbeaten with VOC Amsterdam she won the regular competition. In early 2016 she qualified at the Olympic qualification tournament in France with the national team for the 2016 Summer Olympics.
Goos was a reserve player, but her opponent got injured and she became in the national team. For the final against Norway she was fit, but Goos was selected by the coach to play.

References

1989 births
Living people
Dutch female handball players
Expatriate handball players
Dutch expatriate sportspeople in Germany
Sportspeople from Amsterdam
Handball players at the 2016 Summer Olympics
Olympic handball players of the Netherlands
21st-century Dutch women